AZS-AWFiS Gdańsk is a Polish multisports club based in Gdańsk, Poland. It is the university sports club for the Academy of Physical Education and Sport Jędrzej Śniadeckiego in Gdańsk, and has seen many of the clubs teams becoming professional and at times competitive within their respective sports.

The club currently has sections in 9 sports, these sports being; athletics, bobsleigh, fencing, gymnastics, judo, rowing, sailing, swimming, table tennis, and a section for universal sports, of the focused sports many athletes from these sections have represented Poland at the Olympics.

While these sections are no longer active within the sports club, in the early 2000's the club had competitive teams in rugby and handball.

Sections

Men's handball

Men's handball: AZS-AWFiS Gdańsk - dissolved 2010

The men's handball team, while not as successful as the women's section still had some minor success and played in the Superliga for six seasons between 2003–2010. The teams highest finish was a 6th placed finish in 2008–09.

Women's handball

Women's handball: AZS-AWFiS Gdańsk - dissolved 2017

In the early 2000's the women's handball team was one of the best in Poland, finishing consistently as one of the best three clubs in the country. The club won one Polish championship, one Polish Cup, and made the semi-finals of the European Cup.

Honours;

Superliga
Winners: 2003–04
Runners-up: 2004–05, 2007–08
Third place: 2001–02, 2002–03, 2005–06

Polish Cup
Winners: 2005

European Cup
Semi-final: 2002–03

Rugby

Originally formed in 1988 as an affiliate club for RC Lechia Gdańsk and known as Lotnik Pruszcz Gdański. The team became part of the AZS-AWFiS sports club in 2000 when the team moved to Gdańsk. As a rugby union team, the clubs honours came before the integration into the AZS-AWFiS sports club, with the team finishing 3rd in the Ekstraliga in 1999–2000, and winning the Polish Cup in 2000. The rugby union club dissolved in 2006, with the AZS-AWFiS Gdańsk rugby section focusing on rugby sevens since 2008.

Olympians

In total 11 ASZ AWFiS Gdańsk Olympians have won 14 Olympic medals.

The following athletes have won medals at the Olympics;

Rome 1960

Jarosława Jóźwiakowska: 2nd  Women's high jump

Barcelona 1992

Maciej Łasicki: 3rd  Coxed four
Cezary Siess: 3rd  Men's team foil
Ryszard Sobczak: 3rd  Men's team foil
Tomasz Tomiak: 3rd  Coxed four

Atlanta 1996

Jarosław Rodzewicz: 2nd  Men's team foil
Ryszard Sobczak: 2nd  Men's team foil

Sydney 2000

Leszek Blanik: 3rd  Men's vault
Sylwia Gruchała: 2nd  Women's team foil
Magdalena Mroczkiewicz: 2nd  Women's team foil
Anna Rybicka: 2nd  Women's team foil

Athens 2004

Sylwia Gruchała: 3rd  Women's foil

Beijing 2008

Leszek Blanik: 1st  Men's vault
Adam Korol: 1st  Men's quadruple sculls

See also
 Sport in Gdańsk
 Sports in Poland

References

Sport in Gdańsk